Richard Bonnycastle may refer to:

 Richard Henry Bonnycastle (1791–1847), officer of the British army active in Upper Canada
 Richard H. G. Bonnycastle (1903–1968), Canadian lawyer, fur trader, adventurer and businessman 
 Richard A. N. Bonnycastle (born 1934), Canadian businessman

See also
 Bonnycastle family